= Hot Rumour =

American indie alternative rock band

Hot Rumour are an American indie alternative rock band formed in Los Angeles, California in 2015, by Aaron Ficchi (lead vocals, guitar, keyboards), Josh Ficchi (drums, percussion) and Frankie Siragusa (bass guitar, vocals, synthesizers).

Hot Rumour released their debut EP "MMXVI" digitally on April 29, 2016 to favorable reviews in online music blogs and The Huffington Post

In November 2017, the single Matador was released digitally.
